Xia Ji (born  630 BC) was a Chinese noblewoman of the Spring and Autumn period known for her exceptional beauty, and who reportedly had multiple marriages in her lifetime. Her biography provided the basis for the late Ming dynasty erotic novel Zhulin yeshi.

Biography
Xia was the daughter of Lord Mu of Zheng, the younger sister of Duke Ling of Zheng, and the wife of civil servant Xia Yushu. According to the Zuo zhuan, Xia rose to prominence in the year 600 BC, following her husband's death, when she became involved in simultaneous illicit sexual relationships with Lord Ling of Chen and his two associates Kong Ning and Yi Xingfu; the source further alleges that all three men "wore her underwear in order to make a joke at court", and jointly condemned another minister to death after he criticised them for their licentiousness. Lord Ling was murdered by Xia's son, Xia Zhengshu, after joking about his paternity in front of him; Xia Zhengshu was subsequently executed by King Zhuang of Chu after the latter invaded Chen.

In around 589, Xia married Xiang Lao, a minor official under King Zhuang; following Xiang Lao's death, Xia entered into a romantic relationship with his son Heiyao. At around this time, Xia fled Chu together with King Zhuang's Wu Chen, who had previously advised the king not to marry her. In her lifetime, she was recorded to have married at least four times; the Lienü zhuan by Liu Xiang claims that she married seven times.

Legacy
According to the critic Kong Yingda in Mao Shi zhengyi, the song "Zhulin" collected in the Book of Songs was written to rebuke Lord Ling of Chen for his illicit sexual relationship with Xia. The erotic novel Zhulin yeshi, written during the late Ming dynasty, is based on the life of Xia Ji.

Olivia Milburn describes Xia Ji as a femme fatale whose "destructive beauty ... nearly caused the collapse of the state of Chen" and "who was traditionally numbered among the most wicked women of Chinese antiquity." In contrast, Michael Nylan argues that she "was a victim of powerful men and her fate was determined by her beauty and their greed."

Notes

References

Citations

Bibliography

 
 
 
 

6th-century BC Chinese people
Chinese nobility
6th-century BC Chinese women